Harry Oosterhuis (born 1958) is a historian and lecturer at Maastricht University.

Works

References

1958 births
Living people
Academic staff of Maastricht University
20th-century Dutch historians
21st-century Dutch historians